was a town located in Nishisonogi District, Nagasaki, Japan.

As of 2003, the town had an estimated population of 791 and a density of 590.30 people per km². The total area was 1.34 km².

On January 4, 2005, Takashima, along with the towns of Iōjima, Kōyagi, Nomozaki, Sanwa and Sotome (all from Nishisonogi District), was merged into the expanded city of Nagasaki and no longer exists as an independent municipality.

Pre-merger Takashima had consisted of the following four Islands (order is from north to south).
Tobishima Island
Takashima Island
Nakanoshima Island
Hashima Island (Gunkanjima)

External links
 Official website of the City of Nagasaki in Japanese (some English content)

Dissolved municipalities of Nagasaki Prefecture